Yaga Station can refer to two different train stations in Japan:
 on the Gotemba Line in Yamakita, Kanagawa, Japan
 on the Geibi Line in Higashi-ku, Hiroshima, Japan